Słowieńsko may refer to the following places in Poland:
Słowieńsko, Świdwin County
Słowieńsko, Szczecin